Nightride is the first digital album, second studio album, and sixth overall project released by American singer Tinashe. It was released on November 4, 2016, by RCA Records. Its first single, "Company" was released on September 16, 2016. The album also includes the promotional singles "Ride of Your Life" and "Party Favors". Unlike the single version of "Party Favors", the album version does not feature rapper Young Thug. Tinashe recorded the project while recording her third studio album Joyride. The album peaked at number 89 on the US Billboard 200.

Tinashe confirmed in 2019 that she considers Nightride her second studio album, however her former label, RCA Records, did not and that was the reason the album did not get promoted, did not get a proper lead single and she could not tour for the album. She said multiple times that she and her label had creative differences, which led to them not releasing it as a proper album as it was not the kind of pop music they wanted from her.

Critical reception

Nightride received generally favorable reviews from music critics. At Metacritic, which assigns a normalized rating out of 100 to reviews from mainstream publications, the album received an average score of 75, based on 5 reviews. Randall Roberts of the Los Angeles Times commented that the album "mixes themes of both cruising and loving, and does so through tracks produced by notables including the-Dream, Boi 1da and Dev Hynes". Rebecca Haithcoat of the Pitchfork stated "Nightride sounds fascinating and, while polished, less sleek and cold than the title suggests. It has more of an ominous, broken-down carnival vibe" and that "Tinashe has long preferred shadows and slinkiness to bright poppiness, and [Nightride] is strictly after-hours music. [...] the album is infinitely interesting, possibly more so than the artist singing it. But then again, you shouldn’t count out anyone releasing an album like Nightride." Kitty Empire of The Observer gave a more mixed but still positive review; describing the tracks from Nightride as a series of 'hazy, gauzy tracks'.

Year-end lists

Track listing
Credits adapted from Tidal.

Charts

Release history

References

2016 mixtape albums
Tinashe albums
RCA Records albums
Albums produced by The-Dream
Albums produced by Metro Boomin
Albums produced by Illangelo
Albums produced by Vinylz
Albums produced by Boi-1da
Albums produced by Dev Hynes